The American Wind Power Center is a museum of wind power in Lubbock, Texas.

History
The center was established in 1993 by Miss Billie Wolfe and Coy F. Harris. Wolfe, a faculty member at Texas Tech University, began searching for windmills in the early 1960s. She photographed and documented windmills across the nation and encouraged people to save what windmills were still standing. Thirty years later, there had been several individuals who had restored a number of early mills and Wolfe located one of these in Mitchell, Nebraska. By this time, Harris was working with Wolfe and he arranged, disassembled and moved this collection of forty-eight rare windmills to Lubbock.

These windmills remained in storage until 1997, when the City of Lubbock authorized an area of land for the museum. Harris and volunteers moved the collection to this new site. Windmills were erected on the grounds and inside a modest exhibit building.

In 1999, a much larger building became available, and Harris directed the movement of this building to the park site. He redesigned part of the "metal fabrication building" to better fit the windmills.

Presently
At the present time, there are more than a hundred rare and historic water pumping windmills displayed inside. Another sixty windmills are erected on the grounds with many pumping water.

Complementing the water pumping windmills are wind electric machines. Some of these date to the early 1920s. Dominating the windmill grounds is a Vestas V47 wind turbine. This 660 kW turbine stands on a 50-meter tower and provides (on a yearly average) all of the power required by the museum facility. Excess energy is sold to the local power grid.

The massive painting highlights the history of windmills from the West Texas perspective, from water-pumping structures to wind-powered generators. The work was undertaken by LaGina Fairbetter, an artist originally from Abilene, Texas, and her assistant, Jenny Cox.

The center was unveiled in a grand dedication held on October 17, 2009.

On June 22, 2016 the center opened a new  addition that houses a  "G" scale train display featuring the early 1900s scenery when windmills and trains were life sources for each other. There are historic wind turbines on display, some of which date back to the 1920s. This wing of the museum also houses the Alta Reeds miniature house collection.

Gallery

See also 
Wind power in Texas

References 

Industry museums in Texas
Museums in Lubbock, Texas
Technology museums in Texas
Wind power in the United States
Wind in culture